Social therapy is an activity-theoretic practice developed outside of academia at the East Side Institute for Group and Short Term Psychotherapy in New York. Its primary methodologists are cofounders of the East Side Institute, Fred Newman and Lois Holzman. In evolution since the late 1970s, the social therapeutic approach to human development and learning is informed by a variety of intellectual traditions especially the works of Karl Marx, Lev Vygotsky and Ludwig Wittgenstein.

As a psychotherapy

Social therapy is primarily a group-oriented approach. Its practitioners relate to the group, rather than individuals, as the fundamental unit of development. Social therapy is also premised on an understanding of human beings as fundamentally performers. This is in contrast to more traditional forms of therapy that relate to and understand human beings through the lens of behavior.  Social therapy shares family resemblances with narrative therapy and the postmodern therapies.

"Therapy cult" allegations 

In 1977, Dennis King, writing for Heights and Valley News, penned an article which alleged Newman was the leader of a "therapy cult."[30] The Public Eye magazine also carried an article in late 1977 making this claim, though it was primarily directed at Lyndon LaRouche's NCLC (with which Newman was no longer affiliated).[31] At the time, Newman responded that, "it is of the greatest importance that the entire community of social scientists insist that there be open and critical discussion and dialogue towards the advancement and development of the human sciences; that as scientists and as professionals we do not quiver and shake under the socio-pathological and essentially anti-communist rampages of a Dennis King or others like him."[32] Cult allegations arose again a few years later in the Village Voice.[33]

When political researcher Chip Berlet became editor of The Public Eye magazine in 1984, he first announced that the magazine no longer held to that characterization:

"As you will learn from a forthcoming article on Fred Newman and the IWP, the Public Eye no longer feels it is accurate to call Newman's political network a cult. We do feel that at one point in its development it was fair to characterize the group as a cult, and we still have strong criticisms of the group's organizing style and the relationship between Newman's Therapy Institute and his political organizing." (Editor's Note, Public Eye, 1984; Vol. 4, Nos. 3-4)

Bibliography

Youth development
Social therapy has influenced youth development, most notably supplemental education.  The All Stars Project, founded by social therapist Fred Newman and developmental psychologist Lenora Fulani in 1981 produced a variety of programs inspired by social therapy.  The All Stars Talent Show Network, an anti-violence program in cities around the United States and in Europe, engages young people in the production of talents shows.  Social therapy has also influenced youth development in the arena of school mental health. Social therapy can be considered psychotherapy.

Articles
La Cerva, C. (2005) Social therapy with special needs children and their families: Interview with Christine La Cerva
Holzman, L. (2005) Performing a life. G. Yancy and S. Hadley (Eds.), Narrative Identities: Psychologists Engaged in Self-Construction. London: Jessica Kingsley
Holzman, L. (2004) How Psychology Needs to Change. Talk given at Vygotsky Today Symposium, Faculty of Philosophy, University of Banja Luka, Bosnia-Herzegovina,
Holzman, L. (2004) Psychological Investigations: An Introduction to Social Therapy A talk given at the University of California, Berkeley, as part of the UC system-wide Education for Sustainable Living Program.
Holzman, L. and Mendez, R. (Eds.), (2003). Psychological Investigations: A Clinician's guide to social therapy. New York: Brunner-Routledge
Newman, F. and Holzman, L. Power, authority and pointless activity (The developmental discourse of social therapy). T. Strong and D. Pare (Eds.), Furthering Talk: Advances in Discursive Therapies . Kluwer Academic Publishers.
Newman, F. (2003). Undecidable emotions (What is social therapy? And how is it revolutionary?) . Journal of Constructivist Psychology, 16: 215-232.
Holzman, L. (2002) Practicing a Psychology that Builds Community Keynote Address, APA Division 27/ Society for Community Research and Action (SCRA) Conference, Boston.
LaCerva, C., Holzman, L., Braun, B., Pearl, D. and Steinberg, K. (2002). The performance of social therapy after September 11. Journal of Systemic Therapies, 21(3), 30-38.
Holzman, L., (2002) Vygotsky's Zone of Proximal Development: The Human Activity Zone. Lois. Presentation, Annual Meeting of the American Psychological Association
Newman, F. and Holzman, L. (2001). La relevancia de Marx en la Terapeutica del siglo XXI. Revista Venezolana de Psicologia Clinica Comunitaria, No. 2, 47-55.
Newman, F. (2001). Therapists of the world, unite. New Therapist. No. 16.
Newman, F. (2001). Rehaciendo el pasado: Unas cuantas historias exitosas en materia de Terapia Social y sus moralejas. Revista Venezolana de Psicologia Clinica Comunitaria, No. 2, 57-70.
Holzman, L. (1996). Newman's practice of method completes Vygotsky. In I. Parker and R. Spears (Eds.), Psychology and society: radical theory and practice. London: Pluto Press, pp. 128–138.
La Cerva, C. Upside Down Therapy: Building a Heart in a Havenless World.
Newman, F. (1994). Let's develop! A guide to continuous personal growth. New York: Castillo International.
Holzman, L. and Polk, H. (Eds.) (1988). History is the cure: A social therapy reader. New York: Practice Press.
Holzman, L. (1987). People need power: An introduction to the Institute for Social Therapy and Research. The Humanistic Psychologist, 15, pp. 105–113.
Holzman, L. and Newman, F. (1979). The practice of method: An introduction to the foundations of social therapy. New York: New York Institute for Social Therapy and Research.

Books
Psychological Investigations: A Clinician's Guide to Social Therapy, Holzman, L., Mendez, R. (Eds.)
Performing Psychology: A Postmodern Culture of the Mind, Holzman, L. (Ed.)
The End of Knowing: A New Developmental Way of Learning, Newman, F. and Holzman, L.
Unscientific Psychology: A Cultural-Performatory Approach to Understanding Human Life, Newman, F. and Holzman, L.
Let's Develop: A Guide to Continuous Personal Growth, Newman, F.
Performance of a Lifetime: A Practical-Philosophical Guide to the Joyous Life, Newman, F.

See also 
 Group therapy
 Psychotherapy

External links

Official social therapy-related sites
Eastside Institute for Group and Short-term Psychotherapy
Performing the World
Lois Holzman
All Stars Project
Social Construction Therapies Network

Sites critical of social therapy
Studies on Newman from Political Research Associates; PRA claims to "expose movements, institutions, and ideologies that undermine human rights."
ADL Report: A Cult By Any Other Name- The New Alliance Party Dismantled and Reincarnated

Therapy